Prinzapolka is a Miskito municipality in the North Caribbean Coast Autonomous Region of Nicaragua.

Prinzapolka (sometimes spelled Prinzapolca) is also an important river and river basin in the Caribbean Coast Region of Nicaragua.

Language 
Miskito language is dominant in the region, followed by Mayangna and Spanish.

Culture 
Since Prinzapolka is a Miskito municipality, Miskito culture is dominant, but there are also Latinos and Mayangnas.

External links 
 To view more photos of Prinzapolka taken in the late 1950s, go to this site: https://web.archive.org/web/20100117035333/http://picasaweb.google.com/JimDrebert/SiunaNicaragua1955To1961

Municipalities of the North Caribbean Coast Autonomous Region
Road-inaccessible communities of North America